Gavin Brown may refer to:

Gavin Brown (academic) (1942–2010), former Vice-Chancellor of the University of Sydney
Gavin Brown (art dealer), British art dealer
Gavin Brown (diver) (1984–2007), English diver
Gavin Brown (footballer) (born 1967), former Australian rules footballer in the Australian Football League
Gavin Brown (musician), Canadian musician and record producer
Gavin Brown (politician) (born 1975), Member of the Scottish Parliament
Gavin Brown (rugby league) (born 1977), English former rugby league footballer